The African Journal of Reproductive Health/La Revue Africaine de la Santé Reproductive is a peer-reviewed public health journal that covers original research on reproductive health in Africa. It is published by the Women's Health and Action Research Center and the editor-in-chief is Friday Okonofua.

Abstracting and indexing
The journal is abstracted and indexed in:
Current Contents/Social & Behavioral Sciences
Index Medicus/MEDLINE/PubMed
Social Sciences Citation Index
According to the Journal Citation Reports, the journal has a 2016 impact factor of 0.700.

References

External links
 

Publications established in 1997
Open access journals
Obstetrics and gynaecology journals
Multilingual journals
Quarterly journals
Reproductive health journals